Mithun Manhas (born 12 October 1979) is an Indian first-class cricketer. A right-handed batsman, he also bowls right-arm offbreak and can keepwicket. He was the first ever player from Jammu and Kashmir to play in IPL.

Indian Premier League

Manhas played in the Indian Premier League representing the Delhi Daredevils. In the fourth season of IPL, he was contracted for US$260,000 by Pune Warriors. In the seventh season of the Indian Premier League, he was contracted by the Chennai Super Kings.

Domestic career
Manhas was the captain of the Delhi side for most of the new millennium. He was at the helm when Delhi ended their championship drought in 2007–08, although Gambhir led the side in the semi-final and final. He scored 921 runs in that first-class season at 57.56.

In September 2015, Manhas joined Jammu and Kashmir cricket team for 2015–16 Ranji Trophy season.

Coaching career
In February 2017, Manhas was appointed assistant coach of Indian Premier League side Kings XI Punjab.

In October 2017, Manhas was announced as the batting consultant of the Bangladesh Under-19 team. He was their batting consultant till 2019.

Manhas was hired by the Royal Challengers Bangalore as their assistant coach for the 2019 IPL.

References

External links
 

1979 births
Living people
Delhi cricketers
Jammu and Kashmir cricketers
Indian cricketers
Delhi Capitals cricketers
Pune Warriors India cricketers
North Zone cricketers
India Green cricketers
People from Jammu (city)
Chennai Super Kings cricketers
Abahani Limited cricketers
Mohammedan Sporting Club cricketers